Benjamin Solomon (born May 31, 1998), known by his stage name KING SOL, is an American recording artist from San Francisco, California. He gained online recognition in 2014 through a series of mixtape releases. Be Somebody, his first album, was released on May 22, 2016 and executive engineered by DJ Khaled's We the Best Studios. Solomon's most popular song to date is "DeLorean," a time-travel exploration story.

Career 
Solomon collaborated with Austrian EDM duo Leaving Las Vegas in 2015, creating the hit "Varth Dader." The song was released simultaneously with Disney's revival of Star Wars. He is also known for his involvement in a school spirit video that included an appearance by NBA star Stephen Curry. Solomon has performed with Billboard-charting artist George Watsky (both musicians attended the same high school in San Francisco). In June 2016, he appeared on the front page of SF Weekly. The rapper attends Tufts University in Massachusetts.

In early 2017, Solomon began debuting new songs on a weekly basis, calling the release days "Winter Wednesdays." The releases culminated with a project entitled "Winter Thoughts EP" on February 24, 2017. Later that year, new KING SOL singles were released including the popular record "OFF AT IT." A full album was released on January 26, 2018. Solomon cites this as the most important and sonically diverse project he has ever worked on. A Twitter post calls it his "first year of college in 35 minutes." Album topics include gun control and college relationships.

Later in 2018, the KING SOL Twitter account began referencing another studio album. "The Insomnia Project" was released in December to generally positive reviews. Although some songs failed to compete with Solomon's earlier work, the single "Bill Gates" became wildly successful. This album refined the KING SOL style to a more concrete hip-hop/pop sound. Solomon says he wrote "The Insomnia Project" during bouts of insomnia he experienced in college.

References

1998 births
Living people
Rappers from San Francisco
21st-century American rappers